Mohammed Faleh Al-Ajmi is a member of the Kuwaiti National Assembly, representing the fifth district. Born in 1955, Al-Ajmi studied business administration and worked in the maritime industry before being elected to the National Assembly in 2008.  Al-Ajmi is considered an Independent deputy, but he often votes with the Islamists.  He is a member of the Ajman tribe.

References

Members of the National Assembly (Kuwait)
Living people
1955 births
Place of birth missing (living people)